Weyer Castle is a ruined castle in Bramberg am Wildkogel, Salzburg, Austria.

See also
List of castles in Austria

Castles in Salzburg (state)